Thorvald Ásvaldsson (10th century; died before 980) was the father of the first Norse settler of Greenland, Erik the Red, and grandfather of Leif Erikson, who visited North America centuries before Christopher Columbus. Thorvald's father was Ásvald Ulfsson, whose father was Ulf Oxen-Thorisson, whose father was Oxen-Thorir, brother of Naddodd, discoverer of Iceland.

Thorvald Ásvaldsson was born in Norway. He fathered Erik the Red with a woman whose name is unknown. He left with his son Erik to northwest Iceland, where he died before 980. According to the "Grænlendinga Saga" (Saga of the Greenlanders), "There was a man called Thorvald, who was the father of Eirik the Red. He and Eirik left their home in Jaederen, in Norway, because of some killings and went to Iceland, which had been extensively settled by then;"

References

Thrapp, Dan L. Encyclopedia of Frontier Biography: In Three Volumes. University of Nebraska Press. 1991. p 456.

Viking explorers
Year of birth unknown
Year of death unknown
10th-century deaths
10th-century Vikings